The Battle of Douar Souadek, or Battle of Boukerker, was a military engagement between the French Army, and the ALN.

Background 
In the early morning hours of 1 November 1954, FLN maquisards (guerrillas) attacked military and civilian targets throughout Algeria in what became known as the Toussaint Rouge (Red All-Saints' Day). The country was divided into several Zones, later Wilayas , and each had a leader. The leader of Zone II, was Mourad Didouche, who was one of the six founders of the FLN. He regularly used hit and run tactics to weaken local French elements, and he was also well known to visit individual maquis, to inspect, or train them.

Battle 
On 18 January 1955, Mourad Didouche, was at the head of a group of nine Fellaghas, in a local maquis called Douar Souadek located 12 km from the town of Condé-Smendou. He was most likely training them. They were armed with 6 rifles, and 6 pistols. According to the details reported by the La Dépêche de Constantine newspaper, about twenty French gendarmes led by Lieutenant Malherbe had taken the direction of Douar Souadek in the dawn of 18 January 1955. On the spot, near the Boukerker wadi, they were ambushed by the aforementioned maquis.

According to La Dépêche de Constantine, the battle began around 8:30 am. After only a few shots fired, a French gendarme was killed, and two others wounded, while the Algerians suffered no casualties. Seeing the scale of the engagement, Lieutenant Malherbe asked for reinforcements. At the end of the morning, three gendarmerie platoons arrived from Constantine, Azzaba and El Harrouch, followed by two CRS companies, and reportedly a paratrooper one under the command of Paul Ducournau.

Despite their initial successes, the ten Fellaghas got cornered by the numerically superior, and far better armed French units. Despite this, they resisted until about 5:15 pm. By the end of the battle 7 fellaghas died, two were wounded, and one was able to escape, albeit wounded. One of the killed was Mourad Didouche himself.

Identification of bodies 
Ever since the beginning of the Organisation spéciale, all officers and leaders had Pseudonyms, as to avoid identification. As such, the French army never realized that one of the killed resistance fighters was Mourad, as they thought that it was instead somebody called Abdelkader.

See also 

 Operation Véronique
 Ambush of Palestro

References 

Algerian war casualties
Douar Souadek
Douar Souadek
Douar Souadek
January 1955 events in Africa
Douar Souadek